Tamsita ochthoeba is a moth in the family Erebidae. It was described by George Hampson in 1920. It is found in Burundi, Cameroon, the Democratic Republic of the Congo, Kenya, Uganda and Zambia.

References

Moths described in 1920
Lymantriinae